The Regions Beyond Missionary Union was a Protestant Christian missionary society founded by Henry Grattan Guinness, D.D. and his wife Fanny in 1873.

The name is a reference to the goal declared by Paul the Apostle in his Second Epistle to the Corinthians, "To preach the gospel in the regions beyond you". The society issued a journal named "Regions Beyond".

RBMU merged with EUSA (?) to form Latin Link in 1991. The Britain & Ireland and International offices of Latin Link are both based separately in Reading.

References

Further reading

External links
History of RBMU

Religious organizations established in 1898
Christian publishing companies
Religious organisations based in London
Christian missionary societies
Christian denominations established in the 19th century